Lunz am See is a municipality in the district of Scheibbs, Lower Austria, Austria.

Since May 2007 Lunz am See has been the home of the "Wasser Cluster Lunz".

Population

References

External links
 Lunz.at

Cities and towns in Scheibbs District